San Domingo School, also known as Sharptown Colored School and Prince Hall Masons Unity Lodge No. 73, is a historic Rosenwald School building located at Sharptown, Wicomico County, Maryland.  It was built in 1919, and is a two-story, rectangular frame building with a hipped roof.  It is one of four surviving Rosenwald schools in Wicomico County.  It remained in use as a school until 1961.

It was listed on the National Register of Historic Places in 2007.

References

External links

, including photo from 2005, at Maryland Historical Trust

Rosenwald schools in Maryland
School buildings on the National Register of Historic Places in Maryland
Buildings and structures in Wicomico County, Maryland
School buildings completed in 1919
National Register of Historic Places in Wicomico County, Maryland
1919 establishments in Maryland